In mathematics, specifically order theory, a well-quasi-ordering or wqo is a quasi-ordering such that any infinite sequence of elements  from  contains an increasing pair  with

Motivation

Well-founded induction can be used on any set with a well-founded relation, thus one is interested in when a quasi-order is well-founded.  (Here, by abuse of terminology, a quasiorder  is said to be well-founded if the corresponding strict order  is a well-founded relation.) However the class of well-founded quasiorders is not closed under certain operations—that is, when a quasi-order is used to obtain a new quasi-order on a set of structures derived from our original set, this quasiorder is found to be not well-founded. By placing stronger restrictions on the original well-founded quasiordering one can hope to ensure that our derived quasiorderings are still well-founded.

An example of this is the power set operation. One can show that this quasiordering on  needn't be well-founded, but if one takes the original quasi-ordering to be a well-quasi-ordering, then it is.

Formal definition

The set  is said to be well-quasi-ordered, or shortly wqo.

A well partial order, or a wpo, is a wqo that is a proper ordering relation, i.e., it is antisymmetric.

Among other ways of defining wqo's, one is to say that they are quasi-orderings which do not contain infinite strictly decreasing sequences (of the form ) nor infinite sequences of pairwise incomparable elements. Hence a quasi-order (X, ≤) is wqo if and only if (X, <) is well-founded and has no infinite antichains.

Examples

 , the set of natural numbers with standard ordering, is a well partial order (in fact, a well-order). However, the set of positive and negative integers, is not a well-quasi-order, because it is not well-founded (see Pic.1).
 , the set of natural numbers ordered by divisibility, is not a well-quasi-order: the prime numbers are an infinite antichain (see Pic.2).
 , the set of vectors of  natural numbers (where  is finite) with component-wise ordering, is a well partial order (Dickson's lemma; see Pic.3). More generally, if  is well-quasi-order, then  is also a well-quasi-order for all .
 Let  be an arbitrary finite set with at least two elements. The set  of words over  ordered lexicographically (as in a dictionary) is not a well-quasi-order because it contains the infinite decreasing sequence . Similarly,  ordered by the prefix relation is not a well-quasi-order, because the previous sequence is an infinite antichain of this partial order. However,  ordered by the subsequence relation is a well partial order.  (If  has only one element, these three partial orders are identical.)
 More generally, the set of finite -sequences ordered by embedding is a well-quasi-order if and only if  is a well-quasi-order (Higman's lemma).
 , the set of infinite sequences over a well-quasi-order , ordered by embedding, is not a well-quasi-order in general. That is, Higman's lemma does not carry over to infinite sequences. Better-quasi-orderings have been introduced to generalize Higman's lemma to sequences of arbitrary lengths.
 Embedding between finite trees with nodes labeled by elements of a wqo  is a wqo (Kruskal's tree theorem).
 Embedding between infinite trees with nodes labeled by elements of a wqo  is a wqo (Nash-Williams' theorem).
 Embedding between countable scattered linear order types is a well-quasi-order (Laver's theorem).
 Embedding between countable boolean algebras is a well-quasi-order. This follows from Laver's theorem and a theorem of Ketonen.
 Finite graphs ordered by a notion of embedding called "graph minor" is a well-quasi-order (Robertson–Seymour theorem).
 Graphs of finite tree-depth ordered by the induced subgraph relation form a well-quasi-order, as do the cographs ordered by induced subgraphs.

Wqo's versus well partial orders

In practice, the wqo's one manipulates are quite often not orderings (see examples above), and the theory is technically smoother if we do not require antisymmetry, so it is built with wqo's as the basic notion. On the other hand, according to Milner 1985, no real gain in generality is obtained by considering quasi-orders rather than partial orders... it is simply more convenient to do so.

Observe that a wpo is a wqo, and that a wqo gives rise to a wpo between equivalence classes induced by the kernel of the wqo. For example, if we order  by divisibility, we end up with  if and only if , so that .

Infinite increasing subsequences
If  is wqo then every infinite sequence  contains an infinite increasing subsequence  (with ). Such a subsequence is sometimes called perfect.
If  is infinite, then the -extracted subsequence contradicts the assumption that  is wqo. So  is finite, and any  with  larger than any index in  can be used as the starting point of an infinite increasing subsequence.

The existence of such infinite increasing subsequences is sometimes taken as a definition for well-quasi-ordering, leading to an equivalent notion.

Properties of wqos

 A quasiordering is a wqo if and only if the corresponding partial order (obtained by quotienting by ) has no infinite descending sequences or antichains. (This can be proved using a Ramsey argument as above.)
 Given a well-quasi-ordering , any sequence of upward-closed subsets  eventually stabilises (meaning there exists  such that ; a subset  is called upward-closed if ): assuming the contrary , a contradiction is reached by extracting an infinite non-ascending subsequence.

See also

Notes

Here x < y means:  and

References

 
 
 
 
 
 

Binary relations
Order theory
Wellfoundedness